Xuchang railway station is a station on Beijing–Guangzhou railway in Xuchang, Henan.

History
Construction of the station started in May 1903 and the station was opened in December 1905. The station was renovated during 1988-2000.

Station layout
The station has 3 platforms (1 side platform and 1 island platform) and 10 tracks. The station building, which houses the waiting rooms, ticket office and stores, is located on the east side. The island platform (Platform 2) is connected to the station building by a footbridge for entering the platform and a tunnel for leaving it. To the west of the platforms is the freight yard.

See also
Xuchang East railway station

References

Railway stations in Henan
Stations on the Beijing–Guangzhou Railway
Railway stations in China opened in 1905